Kohle is a surname. Notable people with the surname include:

 Hayley Marie Kohle (1982–2008), Canadian fashion model
 Horst Kohle (born 1935), German football player
 Stefanie Köhle (born 1986), Austrian alpine skier

See also
Kohl (surname)
Kohler
Kole (name)